Heaven Will Wait is a 2016 French drama film directed by Marie-Castille Mention-Schaar. It was selected to be screened in the Contemporary World Cinema section at the 2016 Toronto International Film Festival.

Cast and characters
 Noémie Merlant as Sonia Bouzaria
 Naomi Amarger as Mélanie Thenot
 Sandrine Bonnaire as Catherine
 Clotilde Courau as Sylvie
 Zinedine Soualem as Samir
 Dounia Bouzar as herself
 Ariane Ascaride
 Yvan Attal

Reception
Allan Hunter of Screen Daily wrote that while the film "lack[s] subtlety in places, it still successfully evokes the human heartbreak beneath the news headlines."

Accolades

References

External links
 

2016 films
2016 drama films
French drama films
2010s French-language films
Films directed by Marie-Castille Mention-Schaar
2010s French films